The list of species in Ukraine consists of invasive species. Invasive species in Ukraine are a significant threat to many native habitats and species and a significant cost to agriculture, forestry, and recreation. The term "invasive species" can refer to introduced/naturalized species, feral species, or introduced diseases. Some introduced species do not cause significant economic or ecologic damage and are not widely considered as invasive.

Invasive insect species in Ukraine

 Box tree moth
 Colorado potato beetle
 Fall webworm
 Asian ladybeetle
 Horse-chestnut leaf miner
 Russian pig-flies

Invasive fish species in Ukraine

 Chinese sleeper
 Largemouth bass
 Prussian carp
 Pumpkinseed
 Topmouth gudgeon

Invasive plant species in Ukraine

 Amur cork tree
 Canada goldenrod
 Canadian waterweed
 Common milkweed
 Common ragweed
 Common tumbleweed
 Creeping speedwell
 Curlycup gumweed
 Daisy fleabane
 Diffuse knapweed
 Echinocystis lobata
 False acacia
 False indigo-bush
 Gallant soldier
 Giant hogweed
 Giant knotweed
 Giant sumpweed
 Himalayan balsam
 Horseweed
 Jerusalem artichoke
 Large-flowered evening-primrose
 Large-leaved lupine
 Manitoba maple
 Northern red oak
 Pilewort
 Powell's amaranth
 Prostrate pigweed
 Redroot pigweed
 Shrubby hare's-ear
 Silver berry
 Small balsam
 Sosnowsky's hogweed
 Sticktights
 Tall hedge mustard
 Turkish wartycabbage
 Virginia creeper

Other invasive animal species in Ukraine

 American mink
 New Zealand mud snail
 Peach blossom jellyfish
 Quagga mussel
 Raccoon dog
 Spanish slug
 Veined rapa whelk
 Warty comb jelly
 Zebra mussel

Ukraine
Invasive species in Ukraine
Invasive